Kpedze is a town at the western part of the Ho Municipal in the Volta Region of Ghana. The town is known for the Kpedze Secondary School.  The school is a second cycle institution.

Geography 
It is located at an elevation of 228 meters above sea level and its population amounts to 26,909.  Its coordinates are 6°49'60" N and 0°30'0" E in DMS (Degrees Minutes Seconds) or 6.83333 and 0.5 (in decimal degrees). Its UTM position is BH25 and its Joint Operation Graphics reference is NB31-05.

The place is about 7 km east of Amedzofe, at the foot of the mountain range. The name of the town originates from the word (kpe = rock;  dze = red: Red Rock). In the Eʋe language. Kpedze is also known as Kpedze, Kpedze Awlime.

References

Populated places in the Volta Region